This article details the Hull F.C. rugby league football club's 2016 season. This is the 21st season of the Super League era.

Table

To be inserted.

Super League

Key

Regular season

Super 8's

Player appearances

 = Injured

 = Suspended

Challenge Cup

Player appearances

2016 squad statistics

 Appearances and points include (Super League, Challenge Cup and Play-offs) as of 28 March 2016.

 = Injured
 = Suspended

2016 transfers in/out

In

Out

References

Hull F.C. seasons
Super League XXI by club